The 2000 Yonex All England Open was the 90th edition of the All England Open Badminton Championships. It was held from 7 to 12 March 2000, in Birmingham, England.

It was a four star tournament and the prize money was US$125,000.

Venue
National Indoor Arena

Final results

Men's singles

Section 1

Section 2

Women's singles

Section 1

Section 2

References

External links
Smash: 2000 All England Open

All England Open Badminton Championships
All England Open
All England
Sports competitions in Birmingham, West Midlands
March 2000 sports events in the United Kingdom